Nature of the Beast is a television film starring Autumn Reeser and Eddie Kaye Thomas. It premiered on ABC Family in 2007. It was directed by Rodman Flender. This television film was shot in Toronto, Ontario.

Plot
Julia and Rich are engaged. Despite his protests, Julia succeeds in getting him to come to her family's mushroom moon harvest. Her overweight, pothead cousins search through his stuff, finding what they think are drugs and take them. As the full moon rises, Rich ruses back to his room to take the medicine, but finds it gone; he locks himself in a bathroom and transforms into a werewolf. Julia eventually discovers the truth, and after an argument (about her idiot cousins taking the medicine he needs to control the change), they reconcile their differences. Rich explains that when he was in college, a werewolf bit him on the rear when he and his buddies were climbing over a gate to escape. They plan to kill the Alpha werewolf, allowing him to be cured (Betas like himself can be cured by killing the Alpha if they have not taken a human life). Much to their shock, they find his best friend from College is the Alpha wolf, who forced him to transform to attack her. However, his love for her prevents him from harming her, allowing his human consciousness to take hold and allow him to kill the Alpha. At their wedding, he jokes about something sexual, prompting her to call him a beast.

Cast
Autumn Reeser as Julia
Eddie Kaye Thomas as Rich
Ely Henry as Garrett

External links
 

2007 television films
2007 films
ABC Family original films
American werewolf films
Films directed by Rodman Flender
2000s American films